Laaste Hoop is a village  located 36 km north of Polokwane and falls under the jurisdiction of  Polokwane Local Municipality in the Limpopo province of South Africa. It is the birthplace of Raymond Mojapelo, a manager of a campus radio station is Grahamstown, Rhodes Music Radio. It is under tribal leadership. The ntona of the place is Mantsho Mojapelo and it is under the supreme leadership of Kgosi Malatswa Molepo, the son of the deceased Setlakalane Molepo. The village has one high school, Malatswa High School, and two primary schools, Mamothalo and Laastehoop Primary School. Laastehoop is the home of rising artist such as the rap sensations TituSwaG, SerA BoY De GlorY, Braveheart, L-bang and many more, other notable  house moguls are DJ 3D, DJ afro-healer and DJ Razor Mojapelo. The old Laastehoop primary school is used as offices for a community project tasked with unearthing talent in the area named JSM and also THUTO FOUNDATION host annual career exhibition at the same premises.

References

Populated places in the Polokwane Local Municipality